Felsőszentiván (Croatian: Gornji Sveti Ivan and Gornji Sentivan) is a  village and municipality in Bács-Kiskun county, in the Southern Great Plain region of southern Hungary.

Geography

Demographics
Existing ethnicities:
  Magyars 
  Croats

Notable persons
 Petar Pekić, Croatian writer and historian

References

Populated places in Bács-Kiskun County